Adolfo may refer to:
 Adolfo, São Paulo, a Brazilian municipality
 Adolfo (designer), Cuban-born American fashion designer
 Adolfo (given name), a list of people with the name

See also